E87 may refer to:
 BMW 1 Series (E87)
 European route E87
 King's Indian Defense, Encyclopaedia of Chess Openings code
 Chitahantō Road, Chitaōdan Road and Chubu International Airport Connecting Road, route E87 in Japan